Goran Petkovski (born 22 August 1970) is a retired footballer who played as a midfielder for clubs in Greece and Cyprus. He was manager of Olympiakos Nicosia between 2014 and August 2015.

Club career
Early in his playing career, Petkovski moved to Greece where he would play for Greek second division side Pontioi Veria for 2.5 seasons. In January 1996, he joined Greek first division side Ethnikos Piraeus F.C., making 36 appearances in the Greek top flight.

In July 1998, Petkovski moved to Cyprus where he played for Olympiakos Nicosia, AEK Larnaca FC, Enosis Neon Paralimni FC and finished his career as a champion with APOEL FC in 2004.

Managerial career
He started his managerial career at his first Cypriot club Olympiakos Nicosia in 2014.

References

External links
Profile at Strukljeva.net

1970 births
Living people
Serbian footballers
Serbian expatriate footballers
Super League Greece players
Football League (Greece) players
Cypriot First Division players
Ethnikos Piraeus F.C. players
Olympiakos Nicosia players
AEK Larnaca FC players
Enosis Neon Paralimni FC players
APOEL FC players
Expatriate footballers in Greece
Expatriate footballers in Cyprus
Olympiakos Nicosia managers
Association football midfielders
Serbian football managers